Urophagia is the consumption of urine. Urine was used in several ancient cultures for various health, healing, and cosmetic purposes; urine drinking is still practiced today. In extreme cases, people may drink urine if no other fluids are available, although numerous credible sources (including the US Army Field Manual) advise against using it. Urine may also be consumed as a sexual activity.

Reasons for urophagia

As an emergency survival technique 
Survival guides such as the US Army Field Manual, the SAS Survival Handbook, and others generally advise against drinking urine for survival. These guides state that drinking urine tends to worsen rather than relieve dehydration due to the salts in it, and that urine should not be consumed in a survival situation, even when no other fluid is available.

In one incident, Aron Ralston drank urine when trapped for several days with his arm under a boulder. Survivalist television host Bear Grylls drank urine and encouraged others to do so on several episodes on his TV shows.

Folk medicine

In various cultures, alternative medicine applications exist of urine from humans, or animals such as camels or cattle, for medicinal or cosmetic purposes, including drinking of one's own urine, but no evidence supports their use.

Sexual practice

Some people are sexually aroused by urine, which can include the drinking of their own or other people's urine.

Health warnings
The World Health Organization has found that the pathogens contained in urine rarely pose a health risk. However, it does caution that in areas where Schistosoma haematobium is prevalent, it can be transmitted from person to person.

References

External links 
Urine Therapy explained by Boulder resident Brother Sage

 Shivambhu, non profit organization

Alternative medicine
Biologically-based therapies
Pica (disorder)
Sexual acts
Paraphilias
Survival skills
Urine